Alexander Hamill was a Scottish professional footballer who made over 150 appearances as a centre forward in the Scottish League for Cowdenbeath. He also played in the Football League for Carlisle United, Barnsley and Blackburn Rovers. After retiring as a player, he was a member of the committee at Dunnikier Colliery Juniors and served Raith Rovers as chief scout for 25 years.

Career statistics

Honours

Cowdenbeath Hall of Fame

References

1912 births
Scottish footballers
Association football forwards
Sportspeople from Dumbarton
Footballers from West Dunbartonshire
Cowdenbeath F.C. players
Association football wing halves
Blackburn Rovers F.C. players
Scottish Football League players
Barnsley F.C. players
Year of death missing
Carlisle United F.C. players
English Football League players
Raith Rovers F.C. non-playing staff
Date of birth missing